Worms is an unincorporated community in Merrick County, Nebraska, United States.

History
Worms had a post office between 1897 and 1902. The community was likely named after Worms, Germany.

References

Unincorporated communities in Merrick County, Nebraska
Unincorporated communities in Nebraska